There are two rivers named Tapi
Tapti River (also spelled Tapi), in the state of Gujarat, India
Tapi River (Thailand) (Thai: ตาปี, also sometimes spelled Tapee), in Surat Thani Province, Southern Thailand